The Rivera Plate is a small tectonic plate (a microplate) located off the west coast of Mexico, just south of the Baja California Peninsula.  It is bounded on the northwest by the East Pacific Rise, on the southwest by the Rivera Transform Fault, on the southeast by a deformation zone, and on the northeast by the Middle America Trench and another deformation zone.

The Rivera Plate is believed to have separated from the Cocos Plate located to its southeast about 5–10 million years ago. Seismicity and tomography images show that the Rivera plate dips at 40° beneath the forearc region and then dips ~70° beneath the Trans-Mexican Volcanic Belt. The subduction of the Rivera Plate under the North American Plate, in the Mid-American Trench, has been the cause of the strongest earthquakes in the history of Mexico, including the largest earthquake in Mexico during the 20th century which occurred on June 3, 1932 in the state of Jalisco.  The quake had a magnitude of 8.2 with a magnitude 7.8 aftershock, both of which caused widespread casualties and damage.

On October 9, 1995, a magnitude 7.6 earthquake occurred beneath the Jalisco region and caused significant loss of life and property.

A 7.8 magnitude earthquake occurred on January 24, 2003 near Colima in Mexico.

See also

References

C. DeMets, I. Carmichael, T. Melbourne, O. Sanchez, J. Stock, G. Suarez, and K. Hudnut, Anticipating the Successor to Mexico's Largest Historical Earthquake, Earth in Space, Vol. 8, No. 5, January 1996, p.6.

Yang et al. 2009, Seismic structure beneath the Rivera subduction zone from finite-frequency seismic tomography, Solid Earth,  Volume 114, Issue B1, Pages 1–12

Tectonic plates
Geology of Mexico
Geology of Central America
Geology of the Pacific Ocean
Pacific Coast of Mexico